Somers Cove Marina is a marina owned by the state of Maryland and governed by a seven-member Commission. It is located in Crisfield, Somerset County. 37°58.6 N,  75°51.9 W

The perfect marina for boating, sailing and fishing on the Chesapeake Bay and the Tangier and Pocomoke Sounds. Home to charter boats, head boats, bait & tackle, and stainless steel fish-cleaning stations. This 515 slip marina offers access to many of Somerset County's finest attractions.

External links
Somers Cover Marina
Maryland DNR website

Crisfield, Maryland
Protected areas of Maryland
Tourist attractions in Somerset County, Maryland